St Louis City SC 2, often shortened to St Louis City 2 or City2 (stylized as CITY2), is an American professional soccer team that is located in St. Louis, Missouri. It is the reserve team of St. Louis City SC and participates in MLS Next Pro. The team plays its home games at Hermann Stadium on the campus of Saint Louis University, and at Ralph Korte Stadium on the SIU Edwardsville campus in Edwardsville, Illinois, and at Citypark home of St. Louis City SC in St. Louis, Missouri.

History 
On December 6, 2021, St Louis City SC announced the formation of a reserve team in MLS Next Pro that would begin play in the 2022 season.

It was announced on January 14, 2022, that St Louis City SC's director of coaching, John Hackworth, would serve as the interim head coach for the MLS Next Pro side. At the conclusion of the MLS Next Academy season, academy head coach Andreas Schumacher would take over as head coach of the side. St. Louis local and Bosnian-American Elvir Kafedžić was announced as an assistant coach.

Players and staff

Roster

Staff

Team records

Year-by-year

Head coaches record

Honors 
 MLS Next Pro Western Conference
 Winners (regular season): 2022
 Winners (playoffs): 2022
 Western Conference Frontier Division
 Winners:''' 2022

See also 
 St. Louis City SC
 Soccer in St. Louis

References  

2
2021 establishments in Missouri
Association football clubs established in 2021
Soccer clubs in Missouri
MLS Next Pro teams
City, 2
City, 2
Sports in Greater St. Louis
Reserve soccer teams in the United States